

Gmina Szamotuły is an urban-rural gmina (administrative district) in Szamotuły County, Greater Poland Voivodeship, in west-central Poland.

Villages
Apart from the town of Szamotuły, Gmina Szamotuły contains the villages and settlements of Baborówko, Baborowo, Brodziszewo, Czyściec, Emilianowo, Gałowo, Gałowo-Majątek, Gąsawy, Grabowiec, Jastrowo, Jastrowo-Majątek, Kamionka, Kąsinowo, Kępa, Koźle, Krzeszkowice, Lipnica, Lipnickie Huby, Ludwikowo, Lulinek, Mątowo, Mielno, Myszkowo, Nowy Folwark, Ostrolesie, Otorowo, Pamiątkowo, Piaskowo, Piotrkówko, Poświętne, Przecław, Przecławek, Przyborówko, Przyborowo, Rudnik, Śmiłowo, Szczuczyn, Twardowo, Wincentowo, Witoldzin and Żalewo.

Neighbouring gminas
Gmina Szamotuły is bordered by the gminas of Kaźmierz, Oborniki, Obrzycko, Ostroróg, Pniewy and Rokietnica.

References
Polish official population figures 2006

Szamotuly
Szamotuły County